Claudia Devita Scott  (born 1945) is an American-New Zealand academic. She is currently an emeritus professor of public policy at Victoria University of Wellington.

Career

Scott completed her BA at Mount Holyoke College in Massachusetts. This was followed by MA and PhD qualifications at Duke University. Scott's 1971 PhD thesis was titled Forecasting public outlays: an expenditure model for New Haven, Connecticut.

Scott was appointed an honorary Officer of the New Zealand Order of Merit in the 1997 Queen's Birthday Honours, for services to public administration and the community.

Between 2003 and 2014 Scott was professor of public policy at the Australia and New Zealand School of Government and was appointed a fellow in 2015.

Personal life
Scott and her partner, former Treasury secretary Graham Scott, have a family bach at Arthur's Pass in the South Island's Southern Alps. In 2004, their daughter Carla Devita Scott, 26, drowned while walking in the area.

Selected works 
 Scott, Claudia Devita. Public and private roles in health care systems. Vol. 39. Buckingham: Open University Press, 2001.
 Greene, Kenneth V., William B. Neenan, and Claudia Devita Scott. Fiscal Interactions in a Metropolitan Area. 1974.
 Scott, Claudia Devita, and Karen J. Baehler. Adding value to policy analysis and advice. Sydney: University of New South Wales Press, 2010.
 Scott, Claudia D. "Reform of the New Zealand health care system." Health Policy 29, no. 1-2 (1994): 25–40.

References

External links
 
 institutional homepage

1945 births
Living people
New Zealand women academics
Duke University alumni
Academic staff of the Victoria University of Wellington
People from Wellington City
Honorary Officers of the New Zealand Order of Merit

Mount Holyoke College alumni